Wheal Rose is a village in Cornwall, England, United Kingdom, in the Redruth and St Agnes parishes.

History and antiquities 
North-west of Wheal Rose are the remains of an Iron Age building, a terraced field system, and an excavation pit. It was also used during the Roman period from 43 to 410 AD.

Religion 
Wheal Rose had a Bible Christian chapel.

References

External links

Villages in Cornwall